is a Japanese sprint canoer who competed in the mid-1980s. He was eliminated in the repechages in both the K-2 500 m and the K-2 1000 m events at the 1984 Summer Olympics in Los Angeles.

External links
Sports-Reference.com profile

1958 births
Canoeists at the 1984 Summer Olympics
Japanese male canoeists
Living people
Olympic canoeists of Japan